Helga-Beate Gummelt ( Anders; born 4 February 1968, is a German track and field athlete. She competed in the 1980s until 2000 in the walk. Before 1991, she competed for East Germany.

Gummelt's biggest success was in 1991, when she became the indoor world champion in the 3,000 metre walk. In 1989 and 1990, she was the European indoor champion in the same event. In 1990 and 1991, she set four world records. Gummelt took part in the Summer Olympics 1992, 1996 and 2000.

International results in detail 
1987, 1987 world championship, 10 km street-walk: 16th place ( 47:00 Min.)
1989
World indoor championship, 3000 m: 2nd place ( 12:07.73 Min.)
European indoor championship: 3000 m: 1st place (12:21.91)
1990
European indoor championship: 3000 m: 1st place (11:59.56)
European championship: 6th place (45:18)
1991
World indoor championship 3000 m: 1st place (11:50.90 Min.)
World championship, 10 km street walk: 10th place (44:35 Min.)
1992
Summer Olympics: 16th place (46:31 Min.)
European indoor championship, 3000 m: 3rd place (11:55.41 Min.)
1993
World championship, 10 km street walk: 5th place (43:28 Min.)
World indoor championship 3000 m: 4th place (11:57.14 Min.)
1994
European indoor championship, 3000 m: 2nd place (11:56.01 Min.)
European championship, 10 km street walk: 9th place (44:09 Min.)
1995 World championship, 10 km street walk: 10th place (43:15 Min.)
1996 Summer Olympics: 10 km street walk: disqualified
1997 World championship 10,000 m track walk: quit
2000 Summer Olympics, 20 km street walk: 19th place (1:34:59)

German titles (20 total wins) 
1987—1989: East German champion, 10,000 Meter street walk
1990: East German champion in the 5000 meter track walk
1991—1997 (from 1994 under the name Beate Gummelt): German champion in the 5000 meter track walk and in the 10 km street walk
1999: German champion in the 20 km street walk
2000: German champion in the 5000 m track walk

World records 
3000 m track walk (indoor world records):
11:59.36 Min., 4 March 1990 in Glasgow
11:56.0 Min., 17 February 1991 in Dortmund
11:50.90 Min., 9 March 1991 in Sevilla
5000 m track walk (unofficial free-air world record):
20:07.52 Min., 23 June 1990 in Rostock

Gummelt belonged to the TSC Berlin when she represented East Germany and later the LAC Halensee Berlin. While she was competing, she was 1.69 meters tall and weighed 52 kilograms.

References 

European Indoor Championships

1968 births
Living people
Athletes from Leipzig
People from Bezirk Leipzig
German female racewalkers
East German female racewalkers
Olympic athletes of Germany
Athletes (track and field) at the 1992 Summer Olympics
Athletes (track and field) at the 1996 Summer Olympics
Athletes (track and field) at the 2000 Summer Olympics
World Athletics Championships athletes for East Germany
World Athletics Championships athletes for Germany
German national athletics champions
World record setters in athletics (track and field)
Goodwill Games medalists in athletics
World Athletics Race Walking Team Championships winners
World Athletics Indoor Championships medalists
World Athletics Indoor Championships winners
Competitors at the 1990 Goodwill Games